The Nigerian Defence Academy (NDA) is a military university based in Kaduna, Nigeria that trains officer cadets for commissioning into one of the three services of the Nigerian Armed Forces: the Army, the Navy, and the Air Force. The duration of training at the Nigerian Defence Academy is five years (four years academic and one year military).

History
The NDA was established in February 1964 as a reformation of the British run Royal Military Forces Training College (RMFTC), which had been renamed the Nigerian Military Training College (NMTC) on independence. The military institution trains the officer corps of the Nigerian Army, Navy and Air Force. The initial class had only 62 cadets, and the trainers were mostly officers in the Indian Army. The Nigerian National Defence Academy (NDA) follows the pattern of similar NDA in Khadakwasla, Pune, India. The first commandant of NDA was Indian Army Brigadier M.R Verma. The NDA grew to an all Nigerian training staff only in 1978.
In 1981 itself began bilateral training of foreign militaries. In 1985 the academy commenced offering undergraduate programmes to Military Officers In Training and now also currently offers post graduate studies both for Msc and Ph.D  for both military and civilian students alike. The central mission remains the training of young officer cadets in the 5 year "Regular Combatant Course" in which cadets are groomed in Military, Academic and Character development to instill discipline and leadership skills according to global best practices, culminating in the award of a bachelor's degree and presidential commissioning into the rank of second lieutenant for Army cadets or equivalent in the Navy and Air Force for respective cadets. Until 2011 this course used to be exclusively for males, the first set of female cadets commenced training in September 2011. As of 2019, its total cadet class is around 2500.

The current Commandant is Major General Ibrahim Manu Yusuf who was the former registrar of the academy. He took over from Maj Gen Sagir Yaro. Before his appointment, Yaro was the general managing director, Nigerian Army Welfare Limited by Guarantee (NAWLG).

Academic Library 
Nigerian Defence Academy Library is the main Library that support both teaching and military training. The library acquired and developed information resources that meet the information needs of cadets, faculty members, officers and civilians staff. The academy library was launched at the end of 1963 to facilitate and enhance effective learning. The Library was finally moved to the permanent site on the 16 of June 2009 for effective teaching and learning to meet the objectives and the current Academy Librarian is Umar Lawal.

Commandants
Below is the chronological list of NDA Commandants:

Brigadier M.R. Varma (1964 – 1969) (Indian national and 1st Commandant of the NDA)
Major General David Ejoor (January 1969 – January 1971) (1st Nigerian Commandant)
Major General Robert Adeyinka Adebayo (January 1971 – March 1971)
Major General Eyo Okon Ekpo (March 1971 – February 1975)
Brigadier Illiya Bisalla (February 1975 – August 1975)
Brigadier Gibson Jalo (August 1975 – January 1978)
Brigadier E.S. Armah (January 1978 – July 1978)
Brigadier Joseph Garba (July 1978 – July 1979)
Brigadier Zamani Lekwot (July 1979 – 1982)
Brigadier Abdullahi Shelleng (1982 – January 1984)
Major General Paul Tarfa (January 1984 – 1985)
Major General Peter Adomokai (1986 – 1988)
Lieutenant General Salihu Ibrahim (1988 – 1990)
Lieutenant General Garba Duba (1990 – February 1992)
Lieutenant General Aliyu Mohammed Gusau (February 1992 – January 1993)
Lieutenant General Mohammed Balarabe Haladu (January 1993 – 1994)
Air Marshal Al-Amin Daggash (1994 – June 1998)
Major General Bashir Salihi Magashi (June 1998 – 1999)
Major General Thaddeus Ashei (2000 – 2002)
Major General Okon Edet Okon (2002 – 2003)
Major General Patrick Ademu Akpa (2003 – 2004)
Lieutenant General Abel Akale (2004 – 2006)
Major General Harris Dzarma (2006 – August 2008)
Major General Mamuda Yerima (August 2008 – August 2010)
Major General Emeka Onwuamaegbu (August 2010 – December 2013)
Major General Muhammad Inuwa Idris (December 2013 – August 2015)
Major General Mohammed Tasiu Ibrahim (August 2015 – October 2017)
Major General Adeniyi Oyebade (October 2017 – November 2019)
Major General  Jamilu Sarham (November 2019 – March 2021)
Major General Sagir Yaro (March 2021 – April 2021)
Major General Ibrahim Manu Yusuf (April 2021 – Present)

Alumni

Some notable alumni:

Abdulrahman Bello Dambazau, former Chief of Army Staff
Alexander Ogomudia, former Chief of Defence Staff & Chief of Army Staff
Sani Abacha, former Military ruler of Nigeria
Muhammadu Buhari, President of Nigeria and former Military Head of State
Azubuike Ihejirika, former Chief of Army Staff
Dangiwa Umar, former Governor of Kaduna State
Gideon Orkar, April 1990 coup leader
Tukur Yusuf Buratai, former Chief of Army Staff, Nigerian Army 
Ibok-Ete Ekwe Ibas, former Chief of Naval Staff, Nigerian Navy
Kayode Are, former National Security Adviser and Director General State Security Service
Maxwell Khobe, former ECOMOG Peacekeeping Force Commander and Chief of Defence Staff, Sierra Leone 
Emeka Onwuamaegbu Former Commandant, NDA
Muhammad Inuwa Idris, Former Commandant, NDA
Oladipo Diya, former Chief of Defence Staff
Owoye Andrew Azazi, former Chief of Defence Staff & Chief of Army Staff
Sultan Sa'adu Abubakar, Sultan of Sokoto
Sambo Dasuki, National Security Adviser
Tunji Olurin, former military governor of Oyo State
Victor Malu, former Chief of Army Staff
John Michael Ogidi, former ECOMOG Officer and Commander Corps of Signals Lagos Headquarters

References

External links

 
Defence agencies of Nigeria
Military education and training in Nigeria
Educational institutions established in 1964
1964 establishments in Nigeria